Jacob Lensky (born December 16, 1988) is a professional soccer player who plays as a midfielder. Born in Canada, he has represented Canada and the Czech Republic internationally at youth levels.

Club career

Youth career
Lensky was born in Vancouver, British Columbia and attended Vancouver College. His early soccer career was spent throughout Europe - in Belgium with Anderlecht, in the Czech Republic with Sparta Prague and Slavia Prague, in England with Blackburn Rovers and Scotland with Celtic.

Professional career
In September 2006, Lensky signed a pre-contract agreement with Dutch side Feyenoord, effective from January 1, 2007. He made his Eredivisie debut for Feyenoord on February 11, 2007, against Twente.

Lensky announced his retirement from professional soccer in August 2008, before training with the Vancouver Whitecaps in January 2009. Lensky was also offered a trial with Seattle Sounders of Major League Soccer, but he declined.

Lensky returned to professional football in September 2009, when he signed a one-year deal with Dutch side Utrecht staying there until late 2011, when he returned to Canada.

He was on trial with Whitecaps FC of MLS until he was released on February 12, 2013.

International career

Canada

Lensky was involved with Canada's unsuccessful attempt to qualify for the 2008 Summer Olympics. He played in games against Mexico and Haiti.

Czech Republic

Lensky was a member of the Czech Republic U-21 team and made his debut on March 3, 2010 against Finland. He made his competitive debut on August 11, 2010 against San Marino.

References

External links 
 
 Jacob Lensky Voetbal International 
 player profile at goal.com
 
 

1988 births
Living people
Association football midfielders
Czech footballers
Czech Republic under-21 international footballers
Canadian soccer players
Canadian expatriate soccer players
Canadian expatriate sportspeople in Belgium
Canadian expatriate sportspeople in the Czech Republic
Canadian expatriate sportspeople in the Netherlands
Canadian expatriate sportspeople in England
Canadian people of Czech descent
Eredivisie players
Expatriate footballers in Belgium
Expatriate footballers in the Czech Republic
Expatriate footballers in England
Expatriate footballers in Scotland
Expatriate footballers in the Netherlands
FC Utrecht players
Feyenoord players
Soccer players from Vancouver
German expatriate sportspeople in Scotland